KYNU (95.5 FM, "Big Dog 95.5") is a radio station licensed to serve Jamestown, North Dakota.  The station is owned by i3G media. It airs a country music format.

The station was assigned the KYNU call letters by the Federal Communications Commission on October 20, 2005.

References

External links
News Dakota

YNU
Country radio stations in the United States
Jamestown, North Dakota